Glospace SGK-70 is the world's first Automotive navigation system that is able to navigate using both GPS and GLONASS signals.

Glospace is a brand of НИИ КП ("Научно-исследовательский институт космического приборостроения", the Russian Institute of Space Device Engineering).

Its hardware part is based on 24 channel NAVIOR-24 (СН-4701) chip that handles signals of both systems (12 channels per each system). Its software part is based on ПалмГИСGPS (PalmGISGPS) that runs on Windows CE 5.0.

References

External links
 glospace-info.ru - product page.

Satellite navigation